Sadd (meaning "dam", "wall", or "rampart") may refer to:
 Sadd-e Chamran
 Sadd-e Ekbatan
 Sadd-e Kalateh
 Sadd-e Karun Chahar
 Sadd-e Kharu
 Sadd-e Kheyrabad
 Sadd-e Shavur
 Sadd-e Toroq

See also
 SADD (computing), a sideways bit addition instruction in Donald Knuth's MMIX implementation
 Students Against Destructive Decisions, a students organization